Ælfflæd was a daughter of Offa of Mercia and Cynethryth.

She may have witnessed a charter with her father, mother, and brother Ecgfrith in the 770s. She certainly witnessed a charter in 787 with her mother, father, brother, and two sisters; here she is described as virgo—unmarried.

It is possible that she was the daughter of Offa whose proposed marriage to Charles the Younger caused a dispute between Charlemagne and Offa in around 789–790.

In 792 she married Æthelred I of Northumbria at Catterick. Here she is described as "queen", which has suggested to some historians that she had been previously married, and to a king, perhaps to one of Æthelred's predecessors.

References

Further reading

External links 
 

Anglo-Saxon royal consorts
8th-century English people
8th-century English women
House of Icel